The Estonia national under-23 football team represents Estonia in the International Challenge Trophy competition and is controlled by the Estonian Football Association, the governing body for football in Estonia.

The team's home ground is the Lilleküla Stadium in Tallinn.

Coaching staff

Players

Current squad
The following players were called up for the friendly match against England C on 10 October 2018.

Caps and goals updated as of 10 October 2018, after the match against England C.

Results and fixtures

2016

2018

2019

See also
Estonia national football team
Estonia national under-21 football team
Estonia national under-19 football team
Estonia national under-17 football team
Estonia national youth football team

References

External links
 

European national under-23 association football teams
under-23